The Kolari mine is a large iron mine located in northern Finland in the Lapland. Kolari represents one of the largest iron ore reserves in Finland and in the world having estimated reserves of 500 million tonnes of ore grading 35% iron metal.

See also 
List of iron mines

References 

Iron mines in Finland